The  is a suburban electric multiple unit (EMU) train type operated by Shikoku Railway Company (JR Shikoku) in Shikoku, Japan.

Seven 2-car sets were introduced in 2003 by JR Shikoku along with the JR West 223-5000 series. 223-2000 series cars were later added to each set, and these were renumbered 5201 to 5207.

The 5100 type bilevel cab cars received the 47th Blue Ribbon Award in 2004.

Operations

JR Shikoku
 Seto-Ōhashi Line (Marine Liner)
 Yosan Line ( - )
 Honshi-Bisan Line ( - )

JR West
 Seto-Ōhashi Line (Marine Liner)
 Honshi-Bisan Line (Kojima - )
 Uno Line (Chayamachi - )

Formation
Trainsets are formed as follows.

Car 3 is equipped with one S-PS60 scissors-type pantograph.

Interior

History
The 5000 series sets were all delivered during August 2003, and entered revenue service from the start of the revised timetable on 1 October 2003.

References

External links

Electric multiple units of Japan
Double-decker EMUs
Tokyu Car multiple units
Shikoku Railway Company
Train-related introductions in 2003
1500 V DC multiple units of Japan
Kawasaki multiple units